Monor is a district in central-eastern part of Pest County. Monor is also the name of the town where the district seat is found. The district is located in the Central Hungary Statistical Region.

Geography 
Monor District borders with Nagykáta District to the northeast, Cegléd District to the southeast, Dabas District to the south, Gyál District to the west, Vecsés District to the northwest. The number of the inhabited places in Monor District is 12.

Municipalities 
The district has 3 towns and 9 villages.
(ordered by population, as of 1 January 2013)

The bolded municipalities are cities.

Demographics

In 2011, it had a population of 64,016 and the population density was 194/km².

Ethnicity
Besides the Hungarian majority, the main minorities are the Roma (approx. 1,400), Romanian (450), German (400) and Slovak (300).

Total population (2011 census): 64,016
Ethnic groups (2011 census): Identified themselves: 58,414 persons:
Hungarians: 55,071 (94.28%)
Gypsies: 1,435 (2.46%)
Others and indefinable: 1,908 (3.27%)
Approx. 5,500 persons in Monor District did not declare their ethnic group at the 2011 census.

Religion
Religious adherence in the county according to 2011 census:

Catholic – 15,471 (Roman Catholic – 15,023; Greek Catholic – 438);
Reformed – 10,641;
Evangelical – 5,536;
other religions – 1,829; 
Non-religious – 10,395; 
Atheism – 852;
Undeclared – 19,292.

Gallery

See also
List of cities and towns in Hungary

References

External links
 Postal codes of the Monor District

Districts in Pest County